Koma is a relatively primitive hill-dwelling ethnic group in northern Adamawa, in the Atlantika Mountains, which shares a border with southern Cameroun. Hill-dwellers are spread through the south and southwest of these mountains, including many on the Cameroun side. There are 21 Koma villages in the Cameroonian side of the Alantika Mountains and 17 villages on the Nigerian side.

The largest towns in the Koma area are: Tantille, Chonha, Mani, Nassaraw Koma and Ba-Usmanu.

History
The Koma people became recognized as Nigerians in 1961, a year after independence, along with the old provinces of  Cameroun. Today Koma is part of the seven districts of Jada local government in Adamawa State.

The hill was discovered in 1986 by a corps member.

Description
The Koma have their own language, known as Koma, with an estimated 61,000 speakers. It is a member of the Niger–Congo family. The Koma people are divided into three main groups: the hill-dwelling Beya and Ndamti, and the Vomni and Verre lowlanders.

They are committed to their traditional culture. The men wear loincloths and women wear fresh leaves. Koma men are much more receptive to wearing of contemporary clothes than the women. Customarily inheritance in Koma is in the maternal lineage. As a mark of acceptance and friendship, a Koma man may share his wife with friends, especially visitors. They have an average population of about 400 people per village, and many engage in rearing of animals.

The late Colonel Yohanna Madaki visited the mountains in 1989, at the insistence of the first set of corps members posted to the lowlands.

Culture
Among the Komas, a twin birth is regarded as evil, and twins are considered abominable so much so that until recently babies of multiple births used to be buried alive with the women who had the 'misfortune' of being their mothers. This obnoxious practice of twins killing is out of vogue among Komas who dwell on the plains, but in the out-of-the-way settlements on the hills, the ancient practice still thrives untainted.

Koma medicine men engage in extended farting sessions on the occasion of public dancing ceremonies. They train with a master and are capable of farting for hours on end. When the anus area becomes irritated from prolonged flatulence, it is soothed with a healing powder. The tradition is thought to originate in mockery of puritanical Muslims, who used to enslave Komas and drove them to move their habitat into the hilly areas they now occupy. The tradition was famously documented in a documentary by Alain Baptizet.

References

http://www.iflscience.com/editors-blog/ancient-dna-recovered-from-clay-statues-reveal-secrets-of-mysterious-african-culture/

Ethnic groups in Nigeria